The men's 5000 metres event at the 2007 European Athletics U23 Championships was held in Debrecen, Hungary, at Gyulai István Atlétikai Stadion on 12 July.

Medalists

Results

Final
12 July

Participation
According to an unofficial count, 21 athletes from 14 countries participated in the event.

 (1)
 (1)
 (1)
 (2)
 (1)
 (2)
 (3)
 (2)
 (1)
 (1)
 (1)
 (1)
 (2)
 (2)

References

5000 metres
5000 metres at the European Athletics U23 Championships